Kornél Szűcs (born 24 September 2001 in Miskolc) is a Hungarian football player who currently plays for Diósgyőri VTK.

Career

Diósgyőr
On 30 May, Szűcs played his first match for Diósgyőr in a 1-0 win against Mezőkövesd in the Hungarian League.

In her first match, she immediately became the best player of the round.

Club statistics

Updated to games played as of 15 May 2021.

References

External links

2001 births
Living people
People from Miskolc
Hungarian footballers
Hungary youth international footballers
Association football midfielders
Diósgyőri VTK players
Kazincbarcikai SC footballers
Nemzeti Bajnokság I players